Garcia or García is an Iberian surname common throughout Spain, Portugal, the Americas, and the Philippines. It is a surname of patronymic origin; García was a very common first name in early medieval Iberia.

Origins 
It may have been a Basque surname "Gaztea" which later was Castilianized in the medieval Kingdom of Castile to become "García".

It is attested since the High Middle Ages north and south of the Pyrenees (Basque Culture Territories), with the surname (and sometimes first name too) thriving, especially in the Kingdom of Navarre, and spreading out to Castile and other Spanish regions.

Alfonso Irigoyen believed it to derive from the Basque adjective garze(a) meaning "young", whose modern form is gaztea or gaztia. Ramón Menéndez Pidal and Antonio Tovar suggested it may come from the Basque word (H)artz, meaning "(the) Bear". A third etymology suggests it may derive from the Basque words "Gazte Hartz, meaning "(the) young bear". Variant forms of the name include Garcicea, Gartzi, Gartzia, Gartze, Garsea, and Gastea. The original Basque form with an affricate sibilant (/ts/, Basque spelling tz) evolved in Spanish to the current form.

There are Gasconic cognates of Garcia like Gassie and Gassion (Béarn, Gassio 14th century, real name of Edith Piaf, born Edith Gassion).

Other theories suggest that García is of Germanic origin and may derive from wars meaning young warrior or the Visigothic words garxa and garcha meaning graceful prince.

Popularity

García is the most common surname in Spain (where 3.32% of population is named García) and also the second most common surname in Mexico.

In the 1990 United States Census, Garcia was the 18th most reported surname, accounting for 0.25% of the population. It became more common since then, jumping to 8th place in 2000.

Garcia was quite rare before the 1st World War in France, except in the French Pays Basque, but became the 14th most common surname in France (and the 8th for the number of births between 1966 and 1990) due to Spanish immigration. It ranked 2nd in the region Provence-Alpes-Côte d'Azur for the number of births 1966–1990.

Geographical distribution 
As of 2014, 33.2% of all known bearers of the surname García were residents of Mexico (frequency 1:35), 14.1% of Spain (1:31), 8.4% of the United States (1:402), 6.0% of Colombia (1:74), 4.6% of Venezuela (1:62), 4.4% of Brazil (1:435), 4.1% of the Philippines (1:230), 3.9% of Guatemala (1:39), 3.0% of Argentina (1:134), 2.8% of Cuba (1:38), 2.8% of Peru (1:105), 1.8% of Ecuador (1:83), 1.7% of Honduras (1:48), 1.5% of the Dominican Republic (1:64), 1.4% of Nicaragua (1:41), 1.2% of El Salvador (1:47) and 1.1% of France (1:576).

In Spain, the frequency of the surname was higher than average (1:31) in the following regions:
 Asturias (1:16)
 Castile and León (1:20)
 Region of Murcia (1:22)
 Castilla–La Mancha (1:24)
 Andalusia (1:29)
 Community of Madrid (1:29)
 Cantabria (1:29)
 Canary Islands (1:30)

In Mexico, the frequency of the surname was higher than average (1:35) in the following states:
 Oaxaca (1:22)
  Tabasco (1:27)
  Michoacán (1:28)
  Guerrero (1:30)
  Tamaulipas (1:30)
  State of Mexico (1:31)
  Coahuila (1:32)
  Veracruz (1:33)
  Jalisco (1:33)
  Nuevo León (1:33)
  Mexico City (1:34)
  Guanajuato (1:34)
  Morelos (1:34)

Notable people

A
Aaron Garcia (disambiguation), multiple people
Adam Garcia (born 1973), Australian actor
Adolis García (born 1993), Cuban baseball player
Adrián García (born 1978), Chilean tennis player
Adrian García Arias (born 1975), Mexican footballer
Aimee Garcia (born 1978), Mexican American actress
Aimeé García Marrero (born 1972), Cuban painter and mixed media artist
Akeem Garcia (born 1996), Trinidadian footballer
Alan García (1949–2019), politician and President of Peru in 1985–1990 and 2006–2011
Alejandro García (disambiguation), multiple people
Alex Garcia (disambiguation), multiple people
Alfredo García-Baró (born 1972), Cuban sprinter
Alfredo García Green (born 1953), Mexican politician
Amadeo García (1887–1947), Spanish football manager
Ana García Carías (born 1968), Honduran lawyer and First Lady
Ana María García, Cuban-Puerto Rican film director. in the 1980s and 1990s
Ana María García (volleyball) (born 1957), Cuban volleyball player
Anastasio Somoza García (1896–1956), President of Nicaragua
Andrés García (born 1941), Mexican actor
Andy García (born 1956), Cuban American actor
Anier García (born 1976), Cuban athlete in the 2000 Summer Olympics
Anthony Garcia, Puerto Rican baseball player
Antonio García (disambiguation), multiple people
Aramis Garcia (born 1993), American baseball player
Avisaíl García (born 1991), Venezuelan baseball player
Awilda Villarini-Garcia (born 1940), Puerto Rican composer and pianist

B
Bangs Garcia (born 1987), Filipino actress
Bartolomé García del Nodal (1574–1622), Spanish explorer
Bebel García García (1914–1936), Spanish footballer and politician
Bianca Garcia, member of the New Hampshire House of Representatives
Boniek García (born 1984), Honduran footballer
Bonnie Garcia, Representative of California's 80th Assembly District
Brenna Garcia, Filipina child actress
Brianna Monique Garcia Colace Danielson (born 1983; as Garcia Colace) American twin pro-wrestler known as Brie Bella
Borja García (disambiguation), several people
Brianna Garcia (born 1983), American professional wrestler
Bryan Garcia (disambiguation), several people

C
Calixto García (1839–1898), Cuban military leader
Caloy Garcia (born 1975), Filipino basketball coach
Cancio Garcia (1937–2013), Filipino lawyer and judge
Candelario Garcia (1944–2013), United States Army Medal of Honor recipient
Carlos Garcia (disambiguation), multiple people
Carmelo Garcia, American politician from New Jersey
Carmen García (politician) (born 1963), Bolivian politician
Caroline Garcia (born 1993), French professional tennis player
, Colombian singer/songwriter, frontwoman of Monsieur Perin%C3%A9
Cédric Garcia (born 1982), French-Spanish rugby player
Ceferino Garcia (1912–1981), Filipino boxer
Charles Patrick Garcia (born 1961), Panamanian-American author, Hispanic leader, businessman
Charly García (born 1951), Argentine musician
Cheska Garcia (born 1980), Filipino actress
Christian Garcia, Major League Baseball pitcher
Chuy García (born 1956), U.S. Representative from Illinois
Coleen Garcia (born 1992), Filipina actress, host and model
Concha García Campoy (1958–2013), Spanish radio and television journalist
Cristina García (disambiguation), multiple people
Cristino Garcia (1914–1946), Spanish fighter with the French Resistance during World War II

D
Dámaso García (1957–2020), Dominican baseball player
Danay Garcia, Cuban actress
Daniel García (disambiguation), multiple people
Danna García (born 1978), Colombian actress and singer
Daryanne Lees Garcia (born 1986), Cuban-Puerto Rican model and beauty queen
David García Ilundáin (1971–2002), Spanish chess grandmaster
Dean Garcia, British studio musician, former member of rock band Curve 
Dermis García (born 1998), Dominican baseball player                                                                  
Destra Garcia {born 1978), Trinidadian soca singer
Diana Garcia (disambiguation), multiple people
Diego Garcia (disambiguation), multiple people
Dolores Lewis Garcia (born 1938), Native American potter
Domingo García (Dominic de la Calzada) (1019–1109), Spanish saint
Dora García (born 1965), Spanish artist

E
Eddie Garcia (1929–2019), Filipino film actor and director
Eduardo García de Enterría (1923–2013), Spanish jurist
Elijah Garcia (born 1998), American football player
Eric Garcia (disambiguation), multiple people
Erica Garcia (born 1978), Argentinean musician and actress
Esmeralda de Jesus Garcia (born 1959), Brazilian track and field athlete
Esther Herranz García (born 1969), Spanish politician, Member of the European Parliament

F
Federico García Lorca (1898–1936), Spanish poet and dramatist
Felipe Garcia (disambiguation), multiple people
Fernando García (disambiguation), multiple people
Fernando Soto-Hay y García, Mexican scout leader
Francisco García (disambiguation), multiple people
Frank Garcia (disambiguation), multiple people
Freddie Garcia (born 1952), Mexican-American soccer player
Freddy García (born 1976), Venezuelan-American baseball player
Freddy García (disambiguation), multiple people

G
Gabriel García (disambiguation), multiple people
Gael García Bernal (born 1978), Mexican actor
 Gary Garcia, half of the musical duo Buckner & Garcia
Gastón García (born Darío Osvaldo Gastón García Aguilar in 1968), Argentine Olympic judoka
 Gazzy Garcia (born 2000), American rapper known professionally as Lil Pump
Genaro García (1977–2013), Mexican boxer
Gilberto García (disambiguation), multiple people
Gildardo García (1954–2021), Colombian chess player
 St. Gonsalo Garcia (1556–1597), Portuguese-Indian Roman Catholic saint
Gonzalo Garcia (disambiguation), multiple people
Gustavo C. Garcia (1915–1964), Mexican-American civil rights activist
Gwendolyn Garcia (born 1955), Filipino politician, governor of Cebu from 2004–2013, and since 2019

H
Héctor García (disambiguation), multiple people
Humberto García (disambiguation), multiple people

I
Ibn Gharsiya, Andalusi writer
Iolanda García Sàez, Spanish ski mountaineer
Inez García (1941–2003), American feminist
Iratxe García, Spanish politician, Member of the European Parliament
Isaac García (born 1968), Mexican long-distance runner
Iván García (disambiguation), multiple people

J
Jacalyn Lopez Garcia (born 1953), American artist
Jacques Garcia, French designer
Jaime García (born 1986), Mexican baseball player
Jaime García (equestrian) (1910–1959), Spanish horse rider
Jarlin García (born 1993), Dominican baseball player
Jason Garcia, American professional baseball player
Jean Garcia, Filipino telenovela actress
Jean-Louis Garcia (born 1962), French soccer player
Jeff Garcia (born 1970), NFL and former Canadian football player of Irish and Mexican descent
Jennica Garcia, Filipino actress
Jerry Garcia (1942–1995), American rock-and-roll musician (Grateful Dead)
Jessica Marie Garcia, American actress
Jesús García (1881–1907), Mexican railroad brakeman and national hero
Jesús García (disambiguation), multiple people
JoAnna Garcia (born 1979), American actress
Joaquín "Jack" García (born 1952), Cuban-American FBI agent
Joaquín Torres-García (1874–1949), Uruguayan artist
John Garcia (disambiguation), multiple people
Johnny García, Mexican footballer
 Jonathan Aguilar Garcia (1972–2019), Filipino comedian, actor, and TV host, better known by his stage name Chokoleit
Jorge Garcia (born 1979), Hispanic American actor
José García (disambiguation), multiple people
Joseph Garcia (disambiguation), multiple people
Joshua Garcia (born 1997), Filipino actor, dancer and model
Jsu Garcia, American actor and producer
Juan Garcia (disambiguation), multiple people
Juanín García (born 1977), Spanish handball player
Julio García (disambiguation), multiple people

K

Kathryn Garcia (born 1970), Commissioner of the New York City Sanitation Department
Kyla Garcia, American actress

L
Léa Garcia (born 1933), Brazilian actress
Leury García (born 1991), Dominican baseball player
Lilian Garcia (born 1966), Spanish-American singer and former WWE ring announcer
Luis García (disambiguation), multiple people

M
Maikel García (born 2000), Venezuelan baseball player
Mannie Garcia, American freelance photojournalist
Manolo García, Spanish singer and painter
Manolo García (make-up artist), Spanish make-up artist
Manuel García (disambiguation), multiple people
Marcario Garcia (1920–1972), Mexican-born United States Medal of Honor winner
Marcela Bovio García (born 1979), Mexican singer, lead vocalist of the metal band Stream of Passion
Marcelino García Toral (born 1965), Spanish football coach
Marcelino García (cyclist) (born 1971), Spanish professional road bicycle racer
Marcelo García (disambiguation), multiple people
Maria Garcia (disambiguation), multiple people
María Dolores García Cotarelo, Granada politician
María Esther García López (born 1948), Spanish poet, writer; president, Asturias Writers Association
Marilinda Garcia, member of the New Hampshire House of Representatives
Marina García Urzainqui (born 1994), Spanish swimmer
Marta García (disambiguation), multiple people
Martín García (disambiguation), multiple people
Mayra García (born 1972), Mexican beach volleyball player
Maricris Garcia, Filipino singer
Mayte Jannell Garcia (born 1973), Puerto Rican-American dancer
Melani García (born 2007), Spanish classical singer
Miguel García (disambiguation), multiple people
Michael Garcia (disambiguation), multiple people
Mireia García (born 1981), Spanish butterfly swimmer

N
Natalie Garcia (born 1990), American-born Mexican footballer
Natalie Garcia (gymnast), (born 2003), Canadian rhythmic gymnast
Néstor García (disambiguation), multiple people
Nieves García Vicente (born 1955), Spanish chess master
Nick Garcia (born 1979), Mexican American soccer player
Nicole Garcia (born 1946), French actress, film director and writer
Nina García (born 1967), Colombian fashion journalist and critic
Nubya Garcia (born 1991), British jazz saxophonist, composer and bandleader

O
Odalys Garcia (born 1975), Cuban-American actress and television show host
Oskar Matute García de Jalón (born 1972), Basque politician
Orlando Garcia (disambiguation), multiple people

P
Pablo Garcia (disambiguation), multiple people
Paloma García Ovejero (born 1975), Spanish journalist
Patrick Garcia (born 1981), Filipino actor
Pedro Garcia (disambiguation), multiple people
Pete Garcia, Athletic director of Florida International University
Pierre-Emmanuel Garcia (born 1983), French rugby player
Pilar García (born 1896), Cuban Chief of National Police in 1958 and 1959
Pilar "Ailyn" Giménez García (born 1982), Spanish singer, lead vocalist of the gothic metal band Sirenia

R
Radamel García (1957–2019), Colombian footballer
Radamel Falcao García (born 1986), Colombian footballer
Rafael García (disambiguation), multiple people
Ramón García (disambiguation), multiple people
Raúl García (disambiguation), multiple people
Rebecca Garcia (computer programmer), American computer programmer  
Rebecca Garcia (politician) (born 1973), Brazilian economist and politician
Renaud Garcia-Fons (born 1962), French upright-bass player and composer
Ricardo Garcia (disambiguation), multiple people
Richard Garcia (born 1981), Australian soccer player
Rico Garcia (born 1994), American baseball player
Robel García (born 1993), Dominican baseball player
Robert Garcia (disambiguation), multiple people
Roberto García (disambiguation), multiple people
Rodrigo García (disambiguation), multiple people
Rómulo García (1927–2005), Archbishop of Bahía Blanca, Argentina
Rony García (born 1997), Dominican baseball player
Rosman García (born 1979), Venezuelan-American baseball player
RR Garcia (born 1990), Filipino basketball player
Ruben Garcia (disambiguation), multiple people
Rudi Garcia (born 1964), French football manager
Ryan Garcia (born 1998), American boxer

S
Salvador García (disambiguation), multiple people
Sara García (1895–1980), Mexican actress
Sergent Garcia, stage name of Bruno Garcia (born 1964), French solo artist
Sergio García (born 1980), Spanish golfer
Stephanie Nicole Garcia Colace (born 1983), American twin pro-wrestler known as Nikki Bella
Stephanie Garcia (born 1988), American athlete
Sunny Garcia (born 1970), Hawaiian surfer
Sylvia Garcia (born 1950), U.S. Representative from Texas

T
Tony Garcia (disambiguation), multiple people

V
Vanessa García (born 1984), Puerto Rican freestyle swimmer
Victor Garcia (disambiguation), multiple people

W
Willis García (born 1970), Venezuelan judoka
Winston Garcia (born 1958), Filipino politician and lawyer

X
Xavier García (disambiguation), multiple people

Y
Yimi García (born 1990), Dominican baseball player
Ylona Garcia (born 2002), Filipino-Australian actress, singer, and model
Yohan García (born 1982), Cuban swimmer
Yordanis García (born 1988), Cuban decathlete
Yusmely García (born 1983), Venezuelan hurdler

Fictional characters 
Isabella Garcia-Shapiro in Phineas and Ferb
Juan García Cortes, in the video game Grand Theft Auto: Vice City
Penelope Garcia in the crime drama Criminal Minds
Robert Garcia, in the Art of Fighting and King of Fighters video game series
 Sergeant García, from Johnston McCulley's Zorro franchise
 Antonio Garcia, in the television show Power Rangers: Samurai
 Dr. Che Garcia, the main antagonist in the video game Last Alert

See also
García (disambiguation)
Garzia (name)

References 

Basque-language surnames
Spanish-language surnames
Surnames of Spanish origin
Surnames of Honduran origin
Surnames of Salvadoran origin
Surnames of Filipino origin
Surnames of Guatemalan origin
Surnames of Colombian origin
Surnames of Uruguayan origin